Gun Owners of New Hampshire (GO-NH) is a gun rights organization based in New Hampshire, United States.

GO-NH is the NRA state affiliate organization for New Hampshire.

See also 

 National Rifle Association
 Gun politics in the United States

References

External links 
 Gun Owners of New Hampshire website

Gun rights advocacy groups in the United States
Politics of New Hampshire